This is a list of historical Chinese sources referring to Chinese cuisine. Not long after the expansion of the Chinese Empire during the Qin dynasty (221 BC–207 BC) and Han dynasty (202 BC–220 AD), Chinese writers noted the great differences in culinary practices among people from different parts of the realm. These differences followed to a great extent the varying climate and availability of foodstuffs in China.

Pre-Han dynasty
Documents compiled before 206 BC.

Pre-Sui states
Documents before Sui dynasty (581–618)

Sui dynasty
Documents compiled during the Sui dynasty (581–618).

Tang dynasty

Documents compiled during the Tang dynasty (618–907)

Song dynasty
Documents compiled during the Song dynasty (960–1279)

The population of China doubled in size during the 10th and 11th centuries. This growth came through expanded rice cultivation in central and southern China, the use of early- ripening rice from southeast and southern Asia, and the production of abundant food surpluses.

Jin dynasty
Documents compiled during the Jin dynasty (1115–1234)

Yuan dynasty
During the Yuan dynasty (1271–1368), contacts with the West also brought the introduction to China of a major food crop, sorghum, along with other foreign food products and methods of preparation.

Ming dynasty
China during the Ming dynasty (1368–1644) became involved in a new global trade of goods, plants, animals, and food crops known as the Columbian Exchange. Although the bulk of imports to China were silver, the Chinese also purchased New World crops from the Spanish Empire. This included sweet potatoes, maize, and peanuts, foods that could be cultivated in lands where traditional Chinese staple crops—wheat, millet, and rice—couldn't grow, hence facilitating a rise in the population of China. In the Song dynasty (960–1279), rice had become the major staple crop of the poor; after sweet potatoes were introduced to China around 1560, it gradually became the traditional food of the lower classes.

Qing dynasty

Documents compiled during the Qing dynasty (1644–1912)

Post-Qing period

Documents compiled after the Qing dynasty

Notes

References

 Anderson, Eugene Newton (1988). The Food of China. Yale University Press, New Haven. 
 Brook, Timothy (1998). The Confusions of Pleasure: Commerce and Culture in Ming China. Berkeley: University of California Press. 
 Chang, Kwang-chih; Eugene Newton Anderson (1977). Food in Chinese Culture: Anthropological and Historical Perspectives. Yale University Press. 
 Ebrey, Patricia Buckley; Kwang-Ching Liu (1999). The Cambridge Illustrated History of China. Cambridge: Cambridge University Press.  (paperback).
 Mazumdar, Sucheta (1998). Sugar and society in China: peasants, technology, and the world market. Harvard Univ Asia Center. 
 Needham, Joseph Needham; Ling Wang (2008). Science and Civilisation in China. Cambridge University Press. 
 Newman, Jacqueline M. (2004). Food culture in China. Greenwood Publishing Group. 
 Newman, Jacqueline M. (1987). Chinese Cookbooks: An Annotated English-language Compendium/bibliography. Garland Pub.. 
 Losso, Jack N.; Fereidoon Shahidi, Debasis Bagchi (2007). Anti-angiogenic functional and medicinal foods. CRC Press. 
 Simoons, Frederick J. (1991). Food in China: a cultural and historical inquiry. CRC Press. 
 Wilkinson, Endymion Porter (2000). Chinese history: a manual. Harvard Univ Asia Center.

External links
 Liste von Quellen zur Geschichte der chinesischen Ess- und Trinkkultur (a commented and more comprehensive list in German)

Sources

Culinary